Estelle Mossely (born 19 August 1992) is a French professional boxer who has held the IBO female lightweight title since 2019. As an amateur, she won gold medals at the 2016 Rio Olympics and the 2016 World Championships. As of October 2022, she is ranked as the world's third best active female lightweight by The Ring and second by BoxRec.

Personal life
On 2 August 2017, Mossely and Tony Yoka, also a 2016 Olympic Gold medalist and 2015 AIBA world amateur champion from France, had a son they named Ali.

Professional boxing record

References

External links
 

1992 births
Living people
French women boxers
Olympic boxers of France
Boxers at the 2016 Summer Olympics
Place of birth missing (living people)
Olympic gold medalists for France
Olympic medalists in boxing
Medalists at the 2016 Summer Olympics
Boxers at the 2015 European Games
European Games medalists in boxing
European Games silver medalists for France
AIBA Women's World Boxing Championships medalists
Lightweight boxers
21st-century French women